Bhuyar Railway Station Or Bhuyar Halt serves Bhuyar  and surrounding villages in Bhandara District in Maharashtra, India.

References

Bhandara district
Railway stations in Bhandara district
Nagpur CR railway division